Videnov is a Bulgarian surname. Notable people with the surname include:

Filip Videnov (born 1980), Bulgarian basketball player
Zhan Videnov (born 1959), Bulgarian politician
Zhivko Videnov (born 1977), Bulgarian hurdler

Bulgarian-language surnames